Crime Fighter is a role-playing game published by Task Force Games in 1988.

Description
Crime Fighter is a "TV cop show" police role-playing system, map-oriented, with counters to move around to indicate positions of cars and characters. The rulebook includes rules for character creation, movement, and combat, and a "Sourcebook" section giving background on police procedures and running a campaign. Two introductory scenarios and five cardstock floor-plan sheets are included.

Publication history
Crime Fighter was designed by Aaron Allston, and published by Task Force Games in 1988 as a boxed set containing a 64-page book, a contents sheet, six cardstock sheets, a map, two cardboard counter sheets, and dice.

Reception

References

Contemporary role-playing games
Role-playing games introduced in 1988
Task Force Games games